Starksia williamsi, the Williams's blenny is a species of labrisomid blenny known only from the Saba Bank in the Netherlands Antilles where it occurs at depths of from . It was previously known as Starksia lepicoelia, and is also closely related to Starksia weigti and Starksia robertsoni. It was named after Jeffrey T. Williams, a scientist from Smithsonian's National Museum of Natural History known for his work on Starksia. The specific name honours the ichthyologist Jeffrey T. Williams of the National Museum of Natural History who has worked extensively on the blenniiform fishes.

References

williamsi
Fish described in 2011